Orthurus is an extinct genus of prehistoric bony fish that lived during the Carnian stage of the Late Triassic epoch.

See also

 Prehistoric fish
 List of prehistoric bony fish genera

References

Macrosemiiformes
Late Triassic fish
Fossils of Italy
Carnian genera